James Bull may refer to:

 James J. Bull, professor of molecular biology
 James Bull (cricketer) (born 1976), English cricketer
 James G. Bull (1838–1927), mayor of Columbus, Ohio